Kleshchikha  is a large railway marshalling yard in the Novosibirsk Region of the West Siberian Railway. It is located in Leninsky District of Novosibirsk, Russia.

Ecology
Garbage was regularly accumulated along the Kleshchikha-Ob line section. The illegal discharge of household waste stopped only after the installation of a 24-hour video surveillance system.

References

Railway stations in Novosibirsk
Leninsky District, Novosibirsk